Lynas is a surname. Notable people with the surname include:

Aron Lynas (born 1996), Scottish footballer
George Lynas (1832–1896), English cricketer
G. Augustine Lynas, sculptor
Jim Lynas (born 1942), Scottish footballer
Frederick Lynas (born 1947), English explorer
Mark Lynas (born 1973), British author
Michael Lynas (born 1981), English civil servant
Norman Lynas (born 1955), Irish religious leader
Ralph Lynas (1904–1992), Irish footballer